Prahuaniyeu is a village and municipality in Río Negro Province in Argentina, located  south of Los Menucos on the Meseta de Somuncurá.  The major economic activity is sheep and goat farming, with lambs and wool produced for sale.

On May 18, 2011, Sol Líneas Aéreas Flight 5428, en route from Neuquén to Comodoro Rivadavia, crashed near this location at around 9pm (GMT-3). The impact killed all 22 people aboard, including a baby.

References

Populated places in Río Negro Province